The 2004–05 Ligue Magnus season was the 84th regular season of the ice hockey elite league in France and the first to take the name of Ligue Magnus.

Results

Regular season

Playoffs

National Pool

Relegation Pool

Relegation matches
Clermont-Ferrand faces Caen, vice champion of Division 1 in two matches the 23 and 26 April 2005. After a tie in the first leg match 4-4, Caen won the serie in the second leg matches with a victory 8 to 2. Caen is promoted in Ligue Magnus at the expense of Clermont-Ferrand.

Season Champion
Mulhouse win the first Magnus Cup in its history.

Clermont is relegated in Division 1, but due to financial difficulties, the club filed for bankruptcy. For similar reasons, Tours and Mulhouse were not allowed by the federation to rejoin ligue Magnus the next season. Tours is relegated to Division 2, Mulhouse filed for bankruptcy.

Trophies
Best scorer (Charles Ramsey Trophy) : Steven Reinprecht (Mulhouse).
Best French player (Albert Hassler Trophy): Laurent Meunier(Grenoble).
Best goaltender (Jean Ferrand Trophy) : Fabrice Lhenry (Mulhouse).
Best rookie (Jean-Pierre Graff Trophy): Pierre-Édouard Bellemare (Rouen).
Best coach : Robert Millette (Tours).
Best player : Steven Reinprecht (Mulhouse).

References 

French Ice hockey federation
Hockeyarchives

2004-05
France
Elite